The 2019 Sai Kung District Council election was held on 24 November 2019 to elect all 29 elected members to the 31-member Sai Kung District Council.

The pro-democrats scored a landslide victory by taking 26 of the 29 seats in the council, with Neo Democrats becoming the largest party. The pro-Beijing camp was almost completely wiped out from the council, except for the two ex-officio rural committee chairmen and the moderate councillors led by Christine Fong.

Overall election results
Before election:

Change in composition:

References

External links
 Election Results - Overall Results

2019 Hong Kong local elections